Unidentified: Inside America's UFO Investigation is a History Channel TV series purportedly exposing the US government's secret programs investigating unidentified flying objects (UFOs). It features former military counter-intelligence officer Luis Elizondo, who directed the Defense Intelligence Agency's Advanced Aerospace Threat Identification Program, and Christopher Mellon, former United States Deputy Assistant Secretary of Defense for Intelligence. Elizondo says that he resigned after he became frustrated that the government was not taking UFOs, which he considered to be a national security threat, seriously enough.

Executive producer Tom DeLonge (Lead guitarist of rock band Blink-182) has claimed that "[DeLonge] is the military's chosen vessel for UFO disclosure". The author of a best-selling book about UFO disclosure, Leslie Kean, suggested that these revelations were actually such disclosure: "Elizondo confirmed that UFOs are real; they exist, and they have been officially documented, answering a question so many have debated and speculated about for decades."

Though initially announced to be a limited miniseries, History green-lit a second season in September 2019 after clips from Unidentified that became popular were confirmed by the US Navy to be authentic footage of unexplained aerial objects.

Episodes

Season 1

Season 2

Featured incidents
 Pentagon UFO videos 
 Canneto di Caronia fires (Season 1, Episode 6,  'The Revelation')
 Black Triangles (Season 2, Episode 2, 'The Triangle Mystery')

References
1925-2022
Oporation 
Bluefire 

Testing new flying machine's outside governments knowledge to help humanity.

External links
 
 
 

2019 American television series debuts
English-language television shows
American non-fiction television series
UFO-related television
2020 American television series endings